Ahmed Taib El Alj (born in Fes on 9 September 1928, died in Rabat on 1 December 2012) is a well known Moroccan writer of Moroccan Arabic Zajal poetry and drama.

Early life
He is considered one of the cornerstones of contemporary Moroccan theater. He received several prizes and decorations for his service to Moroccan Arabic language theater.

Career
He has composed more than forty plays and adapted more than thirty. According to Salim Jay, the theater of al-Aldj is a "treasure of the culture of humanity". He has rewritten, in Moroccan Arabic, works by Molière, Shakespeare and Brecht and has had a great influence on Moroccan popular culture. His work was markedly influenced by French theater, especially the plays of Molière and Pierre Beaumarchais.

Awards and honours
In 1973, he was awarded the prize of Literature of Morocco, and in 1975, the Medal of Intellectual Merit of Syria.

References

Wazzâni, Hasan al-(ed). Dalîl al-Kuttâb al-Magâriba A`d:â` Ittih: al-Magrib. Rabat: Manshűrât Ittih:âd Kuttâb al-Magrib, 1993, p. 293

Publications by Ahmad al-Tayyeb Aldj
 Al-Barnît:a. Rabat: Mat:ba`a al-Ma`ârifa al-Djadîda, 2001.
 Al-Mashrah: ba`ada al-Mut:laq: mumârasât, ishkaliyyât wa tatallu`ât, LAHBABI, Muhammad Aziz ed., Al-Masrah: al-Magribî bayna al-´ams wa-l-yawm. (Moroccan theater yesterday and today) Témara: Bayt ´Âl Muh:ammad `Azîz Lah:ababî, 1998, 43-50.
 al-Sa'd. Rabat: al-Djama'iyya al-Magribiyya li-l-Ta´lîf wa-l-Tardjama wa-l-Nashr, 1986.
 Al-´Ard wa-l-dhi´ âb: masrah:iyya fî qasmayn. Rabat: Wizâra al-Shu´űn, al-Thaqâfiyya, 1994.
 Binâ´ al-wat:an. Rabat: Masrah: Muh:ammad al-Jâmis, 1988.
 Du'â´ li-l-Quds. Rabat: s.e, 1980.
 Yűhâ wa shadjara al-tufâh.'' Tánger : Wakâla Shirâ´li-l-Jidamât al-`Ilâm wa-l-Ittis:âl, 1997.

External links
Literatura Marroqui 

Moroccan dramatists and playwrights
Moroccan male writers
Male dramatists and playwrights
1928 births
2012 deaths